L'uomo perfetto is a 2005 Italian comedy film directed by Luca Lucini.

Cast 
 Francesca Inaudi - Lucia
 Riccardo Scamarcio - Antonio
 Gabriella Pession - Maria
 Giampaolo Morelli - Paolo
 Maria Chiara Augenti - Ginevra
 Donatella Bartoli - Sarta
 Giuseppe Battiston - Simone
 Giampiero Judica - Gustavo

External links 

2005 comedy films
2005 films
Films directed by Luca Lucini
Italian comedy films